The Zhejiang Provincial People's Congress is Zhejiang's local legislature. The Congress is elected for a term of five years. Zhejiang Provincial People's Congress meetings are held at least once a year. After a proposal by more than one-fifth of the deputies, a meeting of the people's congress at the corresponding level may be convened temporarily.

References 

Politics of China